The house wren (Troglodytes aedon) is a very small bird of the wren family, Troglodytidae. It occurs from Canada to southernmost South America, and is thus the most widely distributed native bird in the Americas. It occurs in most suburban areas in its range and it is the single most common wren. Its taxonomy is highly complex and some subspecies groups are often considered separate species. The name troglodytes means "hole dweller", and is a reference to the bird's tendency to disappear into crevices when hunting insects or to seek shelter.

Taxonomy
The house wren was formally described in 1809 by the French ornithologist Louis Jean Pierre Vieillot under the current binomial name Troglodytes aedon. The specific epithet is from the Ancient Greek aēdōn meaning "nightingale". The type locality was designated as New York City by Harry Oberholser in 1934.

There are 32 recognised subspecies. These are sometimes divided into three distinct groups and one or several distinct island-endemic subspecies. Some or all of these are sometimes considered as distinct species.
 Northern house wren, Troglodytes (aedon) aedon group – Canada to southern United States
 Southern house wren, Troglodytes (aedon) musculus group – southern Mexico, Central and South America
Brown-throated wren, Troglodytes (aedon) brunneicollis group – southern United States and central ranges of Mexico
 Cozumel wren, Troglodytes (aedon) beani – Cozumel Island off the Yucatán Peninsula, Mexico
It has also been suggested that the taxa from the Lesser Antilles represent one or more separate species, but there is less agreement as to their subdivision, because as far as they have been studied to date, there is little clear biogeographical structure among these populations.

Three additional taxa from more oceanic islands have traditionally been included in the house wren, but are now considered as separate species:
 Cobb's wren, Troglodytes cobbi – Falkland Islands (South Atlantic)
 Socorro wren, Troglodytes sissonii – Socorro, Revillagigedo Islands
 Clarión wren, Troglodytes tanneri – Clarion, Revillagigedo Islands (East Pacific)

Description
The subspecies vary greatly, with upper parts ranging from dull greyish-brown to rich rufescent-brown, and the underparts ranging from brown, over buff and pale grey, to pure white. All subspecies have blackish barring to the wings and tail, and some also to the flanks. All subspecies show a faint eye-ring and eyebrow and have a long, thin bill with a blackish upper mandible, and a black-tipped yellowish or pale grey lower mandible. The legs are pinkish or grey. The short tail is typically held cocked.

This bird's rich bubbly song is commonly heard during the nesting season but rarely afterwards. There is marked geographical variation in the song, though somewhat more gradual than in the bird's outward appearance that can strikingly differ, e.g., on neighboring islands in the Caribbean. Birds from far north and south of the species' range nonetheless have songs that differ markedly.

Behavior and ecology
In North America, the house wren is thought to achieve the highest density in floodplain forests in the western great plains where it uses woodpecker holes as nesting sites. In South and Central America it can be found in virtually any habitat and is, as indicated by its common name, often associated with humans. North American birds migrate to the southern United States and Mexico for winter. Most return to the breeding grounds in late April to May, and leave for winter quarters again around September to early October. These birds forage actively in vegetation. They mainly eat insects such as butterfly larvae, beetles and bugs, also spiders and snails. Southern house wrens rarely attend mixed-species feeding flocks.

Breeding

The nesting habits do not seem to differ significantly between the northern and southern house wrens. They usually construct a large cup nest in various sorts of cavities, taking about a week to build. The nest is made from small dry sticks and is usually lined with a variety of different materials. These include: feather, hair, wool, spider cocoons, strips of bark, rootlets, moss, and trash. The male wren finds dry sticks, which he adds to the nest. Once he is done, the female inspects the nest; but if she does not approve of the construction, she will throw any unwanted sticks to the ground. After this process, the female lines the nest.

House wrens are feisty and pugnacious animals considering their tiny size. They are known to occasionally destroy the eggs of other birds nesting in their territory by puncturing the eggshell. Females that sang more songs to conspecifics that were simulated by playback lost fewer eggs to ovicide by other wrens. Female bird song in this species is, therefore, thought to have a function in competition and is not only displayed by males. They are also known to fill up other birds' nests within its territory with sticks to make them unusable.

Depending on the exact population, the house wrens' clutch is usually between two and eight red-blotched cream-white eggs, weighing about  each and measuring c. at the widest points. Only the female incubates these, for around 12–19 days, and she will every now and then leave the nest for various reasons. While she is on the nest, the male provisions her with food. The young, which like all passerines hatch almost naked and helpless, take another 15–19 days or so to fledge. They are being fed by both parents, and need plenty of food given their tiny size (see also Bergmann's Rule). As the young near fledging, the parents spend much of their time procuring food for them. Brood loss due to predation was found to be light in the Southern Andean Yungas, with predation of nestling young being almost insignificant. Known predators of house wrens at the nest include cats, rats, opossums, woodpeckers, foxes, raccoons, squirrels, snakes and owls. Adults away from the nests can usually avoid these predators although both small hawks and owls occasionally take free-flying adult wrens.

Migrant populations are nesting within 6 weeks of returning from winter quarters, leaving theoretically time for a second brood. In the subtropical montane forest of northwestern Argentina and similar habitat, the southern house wren breeds in the rainy summer months from late October to late December.

In Washington, D.C. area, house wren parents made significantly more feeding trips per hour in suburban backyards compared to rural backyards. Yet rural nestlings grew at a faster rate than their suburban counterparts. In addition, suburban parents spent less time brooding (sitting on the nest) compared to rural parents. Such results suggest that suburban backyard habitats offer house wrens food for nestlings that is inferior in either quality or quantity to what rural habitats offer. Food items may, for example, be smaller in suburban habitats, and force adults to make more trips to the box.

In South Temperate Argentina, southern house wrens dispersed more frequently between-seasons than within a season, with females dispersing more often than males.  Widowed and single males dispersed more frequently than paired males, whilst within-season divorce increased the breeding success of females but not males.

Conservation status

The house wren may have been displaced somewhat in some northern parts of its range by the introduction of the house sparrow, but is still common and widespread throughout most of the Americas. It is not considered threatened by the IUCN, though this would certainly not hold true for several of the island population if they turn out to be true species.

Some taxa, especially from the Lesser Antilles, are rare and highly endangered or possibly already extinct. Several factors seem to have contributed to a varying degree to the decline of these birds, namely habitat destruction, predation by introduced mongooses, and hurricanes:
 Martinique house wren, Troglodytes aedon martinicensis) – Martinique, apparently extinct (c.1890)
 Guadeloupe house wren, Troglodytes aedon guadeloupensis – Guadeloupe, possibly extinct (late 20th century?)
 Saint Lucia house wren, Troglodytes aedon mesoleucus – Saint Lucia, believed extinct by the 1970s, subsequently rediscovered but still precariously rare

The Saint Vincent house wren (Troglodytes aedon musicus) of Saint Vincent was close to extinction in the mid-late 20th century; it has since recovered and today is not uncommon.

As remarked above, these are variously placed in T. musculus if that is considered distinct, or as one or several distinct species.

In culture
John James Audubon illustrates the house wren in Birds of America (published, London 1827–38) as Plate 83. The image was engraved and colored by the Robert Havell, London workshops. The limited 1985 edition by Audubon is available for purchase at the New York History Society.

Troglodytes Aedon was one of the two pets of King Friday the XIII in Mister Rogers' Neighborhood. Trog, as the King called him, was a wooden wren on a stick, and Trog had his own song. King Friday's other pet was a mockingbird (a wooden mockingbird on a stick) named Mimus Polyglottos (see Neighborhood of Make-Believe).

Brazilian footballer Garrincha earned his nickname from one of the names the house wren has in Rio de Janeiro.

References

Further reading
 ffrench, Richard; O'Neill, John Patton & Eckelberry, Don R. (1991). A Guide to the Birds of Trinidad and Tobago (2nd edition). , Ithaca, NY: Comstock Publishing. 
 Hilty, Steven L. (2003). Birds of Venezuela. London: Christopher Helm.

External links

House Wren by John James Audubon (1821) – Hi-definition close-up images from Birds of America.
House Wren Parenting – Smithsonian Migratory Bird Center
House Wren – Birds of Washington State
 
House Wren – Troglodytes aedon – USGS Patuxent Bird Identification InfoCenter
House Wren Species Account – Cornell Lab of Ornithology
House Wren – Video at YouTube
Videos from inside a house wren nest – Video clips showing development from eggs to fledglings (Faunascope)
House Wren Stamps at bird-stamps.org
 House Wren Bird Sound at Florida Museum of Natural History
 
 

house wren
Birds of the Americas
Articles containing video clips
house wren
house wren